The 2016 seasonwas Kashima's 24th consecutive season in the J1 League, the top-division of professional football in Japan. In addition to the league campaign, the club also competed in the Emperor's Cup, League Cup, Super Cup, and Suruga Bank Championship.

Squad

Competitions

J1 League

Table

Matches

Championship stage
The Championship stage consisted of a knockout tournament involving the champions of the First and Second stages, and any team that finishes in the top 3 of the overall table. The team with the best aggregate record earned a bye to the final. The remaining teams playoff for the other spot in the final.

Emperor's Cup

Second round

Third round

Fourth round

Quarter-final

Semi-final

Final

J.League Cup

Group stage

Matches

Suruga Bank Championship

References

External links
 J.League official site

Kashima Antlers
Kashima Antlers seasons